Clinton Larsen (born 17 February 1971 in Durban, KwaZulu-Natal) is a South African former football player and manager who was last manager of Polokwane City in the South African Premier Division.

References

External links

1971 births
Living people
South African people of Danish descent
South African soccer players
Sportspeople from Durban
Association football midfielders
Orlando Pirates F.C. players
South Africa international soccer players
Manning Rangers F.C. players
South African soccer managers
Bloemfontein Celtic F.C. managers
Maritzburg United F.C. managers
Chippa United F.C. managers
Polokwane City F.C. managers